Damir Škaro (born 2 November 1959) is a former Croatian amateur boxer who won the Light Heavyweight Bronze medal at the 1988 Olympic Games in Seoul for Yugoslavia, as well as a Croatian politician. He also competed at the 1980 Olympic Games and the 1984 Olympic Games.

Škaro was elected into the Croatian Parliament in 1995 as a member of the Croatian Democratic Union.

Škaro has served as the secretary of the Croatian Olympians Club.

On 4 September 2019, he was arrested by Croatian authorities on suspicion of sexual misconduct and alleged rape of his female secretary at Autoklub Siget, where he served as President since 2004. In order to prevent him from witness tampering, he was immediately admitted to prison for a 30-day pre-trial custody period, while the criminal case against him is being built by state attorneys. The case was widely publicized in Croatian news media, and led to his resignation as President of Autoklub Siget only a week later. His pre-trial custody has since been extended for another 30 days.

1980 Olympic results 
Below is the record of Damir Škaro, a Yugoslavian middleweight boxer who competed at the 1980 Moscow Olympics:
 
 Round of 32: lost to Viktor Savchenko (Soviet Union) referee stopped contest

1988 Olympic Results 
Below is the record of Damir Škaro, a Yugoslavian light heavyweight boxer who competed at the 1988 Seoul Olympics:
 
Round of 32: Defeated Deyan Kirilov (Bulgaria) 3-2
Round of 16: Defeated Osmond Imadiyi (Nigeria) 5-0
Quarterfinal: Defeated Joseph Akhasamba (Kenya) 5-0
Semifinal: Lost to Nuramgomed Shanavazov (Soviet Union) by walkover (was awarded bronze medal)

References

1959 births
Boxers at the 1980 Summer Olympics
Boxers at the 1984 Summer Olympics
Boxers at the 1988 Summer Olympics
Olympic bronze medalists for Yugoslavia
Olympic boxers of Yugoslavia
Yugoslav male boxers
Living people
Sportspeople from Zagreb
Representatives in the modern Croatian Parliament
Franjo Bučar Award winners
Croatian Democratic Union politicians
Olympic medalists in boxing
Croatian sportsperson-politicians
Croatian male boxers
Medalists at the 1988 Summer Olympics
Competitors at the 1987 Mediterranean Games
Mediterranean Games gold medalists for Yugoslavia
Mediterranean Games medalists in boxing
AIBA World Boxing Championships medalists
Light-heavyweight boxers